Petar Kasom (Serbian Cyrillic: Петар Касом, born 21 December 1981) is a Montenegrin retired football striker.

Club career
Born in Cetinje (SR Montenegro, SFR Yugoslavia), Kasom started playing in the youth teams of Serbian giants FK Partizan where he spent eight years. In 2002, after playing two seasons on loan with Partizan's satellite club FK Teleoptik, he signed with FK Budućnost Banatski Dvor. He played the second half of the 2003–04 season on loan at FK Bečej. In 2006, he moved to another Serbian top flight club FK Smederevo where he would stay until summer 2008, with the exception the half season he spent in Cyprus playing with the Cypriot First Division side AEP Paphos in the second half of the 2006–07 season. In 2009, he joined Montenegrin First League side OFK Grbalj where he played during the 2009–10 season.

References

External link 
 Profile at Jelenfootball

1981 births
Living people
Sportspeople from Cetinje
Association football forwards
Serbia and Montenegro footballers
Montenegrin footballers
FK Partizan players
FK Teleoptik players
FK Budućnost Banatski Dvor players
OFK Bečej 1918 players
FK Smederevo players
AEP Paphos FC players
OFK Grbalj players
First League of Serbia and Montenegro players
Second League of Serbia and Montenegro players
Serbian SuperLiga players
Cypriot First Division players
Montenegrin First League players
Montenegrin expatriate footballers
Expatriate footballers in Cyprus
Montenegrin expatriate sportspeople in Cyprus
Expatriate footballers in Serbia
Montenegrin expatriate sportspeople in Serbia